A friendly caller program is a program in which a 9-1-1 dispatch center regularly calls local older people and persons with disabilities to check on their welfare. If the callers do not call in or answer calls, emergency responders go to their homes.

References

Emergency communication
Emergency population warning systems
Telecommunications in Canada
Telecommunications in the United States